This is a list of Neolithic cultures of China that have been unearthed by archaeologists. They are sorted in chronological order from earliest to latest and are followed by a schematic visualization of these cultures.

It would seem that the definition of Neolithic in China is undergoing changes. The discovery in 2012 of pottery about 20,000 years BC indicates that this measure alone can no longer be used to define the period. It will fall to the more difficult task of determining when cereal domestication started.

List

Schematic outline

These cultures existed for the period from 8500 to 1500 BC. Neolithic cultures remain unmarked and Bronze Age cultures (from 2000 BC) are marked with *. There are many differences in opinion on the dating for these cultures, so the dates chosen here are tentative:

For this schematic outline of its neolithic cultures China has been divided into the following nine parts:
Northeast China: Inner Mongolia, Heilongjiang, Jilin and Liaoning.
Northwest China (Upper Yellow River): Gansu, Qinghai and western part of Shaanxi.
North-central China (Middle Yellow River): Shanxi, Hebei, western part of Henan and eastern part of Shaanxi. 
Eastern China (lower Yellow River): Shandong, Anhui, northern part of Jiangsu and eastern part Henan.
East-south-eastern China (lower Yangtze): Zhejiang and biggest part of Jiangsu.
South-central China (middle Yangtze): Hubei and northern part of Hunan.
Sichuan and upper Yangtze.
Southeast China: Fujian, Jiangxi, Guangdong, Guangxi, southern part of Hunan, lower Red River in the northern part of Vietnam and the island of Taiwan.
Southwest China: Yunnan and Guizhou.

See also

History of China
List of Bronze Age sites in China
List of Palaeolithic sites in China
List of inventions and discoveries of Neolithic China
Neolithic signs in China
Prehistoric Asia
Prehistoric Beifudi site
Three Sovereigns and Five Emperors
Xia dynasty

References

Further reading
 

 

 

 

 

Liu, Li; Chen, Xingcan (eds). 2012. The archaeology of China: from the late paleolithic to the early bronze age. Cambridge University Press. 

Underhill, Anne P (ed). 2013. A companion to Chinese archaeology. Blackwell Publishing. 

 

 
chapter 7, Higham, Charles, 'East Asian Agriculture and Its Impact', p.234-264.
chapter 15, Higham, Charles, 'Complex Societies of East and Southeast Asia', p.552-594

External links
 

 
 
Neolithic cultures